School District 14 is a defunct Canadian school district in New Brunswick.  It was an Anglophone district operating 30 public schools (gr. K-12) in York, Carleton, Victoria and Madawaska counties. Enrollment was approximately 8,500 students and 570 teachers. District 14 is headquartered in Woodstock. In 2012, it was amalgamated into Anglophone West School District.

List of schools

High schools
 Canterbury
 Carleton North
 Nackawic
 Southern Victoria
 Tobique Valley
 Woodstock

Middle schools
 Bath
 Florenceville
 Nackawic
 Perth-Andover
 Woodstock

Elementary schools
 Andover
 Bath
 Bristol
 Debec
 Donald Fraser Memorial
 Florenceville
 Juniper
 Millville
 Nackawic
 Southern Carleton
 Woodstock Centennial

Combined elementary and middle schools
 Centreville Community School
 Keswick Valley Memorial

Private schools
 Apostolic Christian School
 Perth Seventh-day Adventist School
 River Valley Christian Academy
 Riverdale
 Somerville Christian Academy
 St. John Valley Mennonite School
 Woodstock Christian Academy

Other schools
 Hartland Community School
 John Caldwell
 Saint Mary's Academy

External links
 http://www.district14.nbed.nb.ca

Former school districts in New Brunswick
Education in York County, New Brunswick
Education in Carleton County, New Brunswick
Education in Victoria County, New Brunswick
Education in Madawaska County, New Brunswick